Neil Stanley Crawford (May 26, 1931 – August 25, 1992) was a politician and jazz musician from Alberta, Canada.

Early life
Neil Crawford was born in Prince Albert, Saskatchewan.  He married Catherine May Hughes September 3, 1951, graduated from the University of Saskatchewan Law School in 1954, and practiced law in Edmonton, Alberta during the 1950s and 1960s, before becoming involved in politics.  Crawford served as an Alderman for the city of Edmonton from 1966–1971.

Federal involvement
Crawford was actively involved with federal politics. He served as an executive assistant to Prime Minister John Diefenbaker between 1961 and 1963, and served as Young Progressive Conservative Association President from 1963 to 1964.

He had a jazz band composed of provincial MLAs called the Tory Blue Notes, and played trumpet.

Provincial politics

Crawford was elected to the Legislative Assembly of Alberta for the first time in the 1971 Alberta general election for the new district of Edmonton-Parkallen. He served a total of five terms from 1971 to 1989 for the Progressive Conservatives.

During his time in the assembly he served numerous portfolios in the cabinet. He was Minister of Health and Social Development, Minister of Labour, Minister of Municipal Affairs, Attorney General, Government House Leader and lastly responsible for the government's Special Projects.

In December 1986 he held a press conference to announce he was afflicted with Lou Gehrig's disease (also known as ALS). He served out the rest of his term and retired in 1989.

He died on August 25, 1992 of ALS in Edmonton. The Neil Crawford Centre, a Government of Alberta office complex in south Edmonton, is named in his honour.  The Edmonton subdivision of Crawford Plains, Edmonton, as well as the Crawford Plains Elementary School are also named for him.

References

External links
Tribute to Neil Crawford Legislative Assembly of Alberta Hansard September 21, 1992

1931 births
1992 deaths
Canadian jazz trumpeters
Male trumpeters
Neurological disease deaths in Alberta
Deaths from motor neuron disease
Edmonton city councillors
Lawyers in Alberta
Progressive Conservative Association of Alberta MLAs
Members of the Executive Council of Alberta
University of Saskatchewan College of Law alumni
20th-century trumpeters
20th-century Canadian male musicians
Canadian male jazz musicians
20th-century Canadian legislators
Politicians from Prince Albert, Saskatchewan